Jethro Tull – The String Quartets is a studio album featuring Ian Anderson, John O'Hara and the Carducci String Quartet, arranged by O'Hara. It was released on 24 March 2017.

CD track listing
"In the Past (Living in the Past)" – 4:10
"Sossity Waiting (Sossity, You're a Woman/Reasons for Waiting)" – 4:45
"Bungle (Bungle in the Jungle)" – 3:49
"We Used to Bach (We Used to Know/Bach Prelude C Major)" – 4:54
"Farm, the Fourway (Farm on the Freeway)" – 3:44
"Songs and Horses (Songs from the Wood/Heavy Horses)" – 3:53
"Only the Giving (Wond'ring Aloud)" – 1:58
"Loco (Locomotive Breath)" – 4:33
"Pass the Bottle (A Christmas Song)" – 3:02
"Velvet Gold (Velvet Green)" – 4:06
"Ring Out These Bells (Ring Out, Solstice Bells)" – 3:56
"Aquafugue (Aqualung)" – 5:13

Vinyl track listing
"In the Past (Living in the Past)" – 4:10
"Sossity Waiting (Sossity, You're a Woman/Reasons for Waiting)" – 4:45
"Bungle (Bungle in the Jungle)" – 3:49
"Ring Out These Bells (Ring Out, Solstice Bells)" – 3:56
"Farm, the Fourway (Farm on the Freeway)" – 3:44
"We Used to Bach (We Used to Know/Bach Prelude C Major)" – 4:54
"Velvet Gold (Velvet Green)" – 4:06
"Pass the Bottle (A Christmas Song)" – 3:02
"Loco (Locomotive Breath)" – 4:33
"Only the Giving (Wond'ring Aloud)" – 1:58
"Songs and Horses (Songs from the Wood/Heavy Horses)" – 3:53
"Aquafugue (Aqualung)" – 5:13

Personnel
 Matthew Denton – violin
 Michelle Fleming – violin
 Eoin Schmidt-Martin – viola
 Emma Denton – cello
 Ian Anderson – flute, vocals, acoustic guitar, mandolin
 John O'Hara – orchestral arrangements, celesta, piano

Charts

See also
 A Classic Case
 Ian Anderson Plays the Orchestral Jethro Tull

References

External links
 Official Website info

Ian Anderson albums
Albums produced by Ian Anderson
Orchestral music
Jethro Tull (band)